FC Maramureş Universitar Baia Mare was a Romanian football team from Baia Mare, Maramureș County, founded in 2010 and dissolved in 2013.

History

The club was founded in 2010 to continue the football tradition in Baia Mare after the dissolution of FC Baia Mare. But in the summer of 2012 the traditional old club was refounded and Maramureș Universitar Baia Mare soon became no. 2 in town.

After the relegation from the Liga II in the summer of 2013, the club was dissolved.

Honours

Liga III:
Winners (1): 2010–11

External links
 An article about FCMU Baia Mare's foundation

Association football clubs established in 2010
Defunct football clubs in Romania
Football clubs in Maramureș County
Association football clubs disestablished in 2013
Liga II clubs
Liga III clubs
2010 establishments in Romania
2013 disestablishments in Romania